Jenny Bürde-Ney (1826-1886) was a German operatic soprano. She performed many leading roles in prestigious opera houses, and later became a singing teacher.

Early life
The daughter of singer Katharina Ney-Segatta, Bürde-Ney was trained from an early age by her mother.

Career

Operatic roles
In her first recorded major role in 1845 she sang the title role in Bellini's Norma in the city of  Olomouc, now in the Czech Republic. 
Between 1847-1848 she was engaged in Prague, and between 1848-1850 in Lviv.  After Lviv, she was invited to Vienna by the Wiener Hofoper, now the Vienna State Opera. During her time in Vienna she also made appearances abroad. She appeared as Leonora in the British premiere of Verdi's Il trovatore at Covent Garden, and also appeared at the same location with Karl Formes in Fidelio in 1852.
After working in Vienna until 1853 (when her mother died) she moved to Dresden, where she developed into an artist of European reputation at the Dresden Königliches Opernhaus, which incidentally burned down shortly after her retirement. Her engagement in Dresden followed in the footsteps of the notable soprano Wilhelmine Schröder-Devrient.
Among her roles in Dresden were Pamina in Mozart's The Magic Flute.

Teacher and church singer
Bürde-Ney retired from the opera stage in 1866, and became a singing teacher in Dresden. She also frequently sang at the Catholic Church of the Royal Court of Saxony, now known simply as Dresden Cathedral.

Personal life
Bürde-Ney married the actor Emil Bürde in 1856. She died in 1886.

References 

German women singers
German operatic sopranos
1826 births
1886 deaths